Santa María Chilchotla is a town and municipality in Oaxaca in south-western Mexico.  
It is part of the Teotitlán District in the north of the Cañada Region.

Municipalities of Oaxaca